Sunnmøringen (The Sunnmøre Resident) is a local Norwegian newspaper published twice a week in the municipality of Stranda in Møre og Romsdal county.

The paper covers news from the municipality of Stranda. It was edited from 1994 to 2007 by Helge Søvik, and then by Gyri Aure from 2007 to 2008, when Herborg Bergaplass took over the editorship. In 2017, Bjørn Arild Hatlem  was succeeded by Johan Behrentz as editor. The newspaper is owned by Polaris Media.

Circulation
According to the Norwegian Audit Bureau of Circulations and National Association of Local Newspapers, Sunnmøringen has had the following annual circulation:
2004: 2,092
2005: 2,064
2006: 1,990
2007: 1,986
2008: 1,981
2009: 1,992
2010: 1,974
2011: 2,013
2012: 1,976
2013: 1,887
2014: 1,822
2015: 1,742
2016: 1,605

References

External links
Sunnmøringen homepage

Newspapers published in Norway
Norwegian-language newspapers
Stranda
Mass media in Møre og Romsdal
Publications established in 1946
1946 establishments in Norway